Huntsmens' Guard Regiment may refer to 

Garderegiment Grenadiers en Jagers or Grenadiers' and Huntsmens' Guard Regiment of the Netherlands Army 
Guard Jaeger Regiment or Huntsmens' Guard Regiment of the Finnish Army